Michael Goold (1930 – 25 November 2005) was an Irish Gaelic footballer. At club level he played with Macroom and was also a member of the Cork senior football team.

Playing career

Goold first played Gaelic football with the Macroom minor team that won the Cork MFC title in 1948. He also won a Harty Cup medal that year as a boarder at St. Colman's College in Fermoy. He later lined out with University College Cork before winning a Sigerson Cup title with University College Dublin in 1954. Goold later lined out at senior level with Macroom and captained the team to the Cork SFC in 1958 before winning a second title in 1962.

Goold first played for Cork as a member of the minor team in 1948. He joined the junior team in 1950 before immediately being drafted onto the senior team. Goold won a National League title in 1952 before winning a Munster SFC title as a substitute later that season. He enjoyed further inter-county success throughout the 1956-57 seasons, winning a second National League title and consecutive Munster SFC medals. The ultimate success eluded Goold as Cork suffered back-to-back All-Ireland final defeats by Galway in 1956 and Louth in 1957. His performances for Cork also earned inclusion on the Munster team in the Railway Cup.

Death

Goold died at the Bon Secours Hospital in Cork on 25 November 2005, aged 75.

Honours

St. Colman's College
Harty Cup: 1948

University College Dublin
Sigerson Cup: 1954

Macroom
Cork Senior Football Championship: 1958 (c), 1962
Cork Minor Football Championship: 1948

Cork
Munster Senior Football Championship: 1952, 1956, 1957
National Football League: 1951-52, 1955-56

References

1930 births
2005 deaths
UCC Gaelic footballers
UCD Gaelic footballers
Macroom Gaelic footballers
Cork inter-county Gaelic footballers
Munster inter-provincial Gaelic footballers
People educated at St Colman's College, Fermoy